Greg Howard is an American politician currently serving as a Connecticut State Representative from the 43rd District, which encompasses the towns of Stonington and North Stonington. Howard, a Police Detective from the town of Stonington, was first elected to the seat in 2020. In 2021, Howard was a major proponent of a bill that would legalize online gambling in Connecticut. In the House, Howard currently serves as a member of both the Appropriations and Judiciary Committees.

References

External links

Living people
Year of birth missing (living people)
Republican Party members of the Connecticut House of Representatives
21st-century American politicians